The Village Nightclub, also known as The Village, is a nightclub and music venue located in Lancaster, Pennsylvania. 

The club opened in 1953 and has since hosted  Bruce Springsteen, Cyndi Lauper, Cheap Trick, Dio, Blue Öyster Cult, Kansas, and other bands and musicians.

References

External links
 

Nightclubs in Pennsylvania
1953 establishments in Pennsylvania
Buildings and structures in Lancaster, Pennsylvania